RRNA small subunit pseudouridine methyltransferase Nep1 (Nep1, nucleolar essential protein 1) is an enzyme with systematic name S-adenosyl-L-methionine:18S rRNA (pseudouridine1191-N1)-methyltransferase. This enzyme catalyses the following chemical reaction

 S-adenosyl-L-methionine + pseudouridine1191 in yeast 18S rRNA  S-adenosyl-L-homocysteine + N1-methylpseudouridine1191 in yeast 18S rRNA

This enzyme recognizes specific pseudouridine residues (Psi) in small subunits of ribosomal RNA based on the local RNA structure.

A point mutation in the ribosome biogenesis factor Nep1 impairs its nucleolar localisation and RNA binding and causes the Bowen-Conradi syndrome.
 
.

References

External links 
 

EC 2.1.1